Apamea purpurina is a moth of the  family Noctuidae.

Apamea (moth)
Moths described in 1908